This is a list of main career statistics of Spanish professional tennis player Carlos Alcaraz. All statistics are according to the ATP World Tour and ITF websites.

Performance timelines

Only main-draw results in ATP Tour, Grand Slam tournaments, Davis Cup/ATP Cup/Laver Cup and Olympic Games are included in win–loss records.

Singles
Current through the 2023 Indian Wells Masters.

Significant finals

Grand Slam finals

Singles: 1 (1 title)

Masters 1000 finals

Singles: 3 (3 titles)
Alcaraz is the first player born in the 2000s to win an  ATP Masters 1000 title and also to win multiple Masters 1000 titles.

ATP career finals

Singles: 11 (8 titles, 3 runner-ups)
(*) signifies tournaments where Alcaraz won the title without dropping a set.

ATP Next Generation finals

Singles: 1 (1 title)

ATP Challenger and ITF Futures finals

Singles: 9 (7 titles, 2 runner-ups)

Career Grand Slam statistics

Best Grand Slam tournament results details
Grand Slam winners are in boldface, and runner-ups are in italics.

ATP ranking

General 

Alcaraz has spent the total 96* consecutive weeks in the ATP Tour's top-100.

He also has spent the total 48* consecutive in the ATP Tour's top-10.

He first ascended into the top-10 on 25 April 2022 when he moved up from No. 11 to No. 9. Since then, he's spent:

No. 1 – 21 weeks*
No. 2 – 7 weeks
No. 3 – 0 weeks
No. 4 – 6 weeks
No. 5 – 1 weeks
No. 6 – 6 weeks
No. 7 – 5 weeks
No. 8 – 0 weeks
No. 9 – 2 weeks
No. 10 – 0 weeks

*.

Record against top 10 players

Alcaraz's record against players who have been ranked in the top 10, with those who are active in boldface. Only ATP Tour main draw matches are considered:

Top 10 wins
He has a  record against players who were, at the time the match was played, ranked in the top 10.* .Exhibition matches
Singles (4 losses)

ATP Tour career earnings* Statistics correct .''

See also 

 Spain Davis Cup team
 List of Spain Davis Cup team representatives
Tennis in Spain
Sport in Spain

References

External links
 
 Carlos Alcaraz at the ITF profile
 

Alcaraz, Carlos
Sport in Spain